Greetland railway station was a railway station that served the village of Greetland in West Yorkshire, England.

History
The station was originally opened as North Dean in July 1844. It was subsequently changed to North Dean and Greetland and then to Greetland in 1897. Situated near the junction of the main Calder Valley line and the steeply-graded branch towards Halifax (which opened at the same time as the station), it also served as the junction station for the Stainland Branch from its opening in 1875 until 1929. It was closed to passenger traffic on 8 September 1962.

The signal box seen in the picture was reopened in 2000 after a prolonged period of disuse but closed in August 2009 (along with its neighbour at ). By December 2009 it had been demolished.  The junction and associated signalling is now operated from Healey Mills PSB.

References

External links
 https://flickr.com/photos/thanoz/2933820371/ Greetland railway station, 1962

Disused railway stations in Calderdale
Former Lancashire and Yorkshire Railway stations
Railway stations in Great Britain opened in 1844
Railway stations in Great Britain closed in 1962
Elland